The  was a Japanese samurai clan which served as retainers to the Oda clan based in Owari.

The Hayashi were descendants of the Inaba clan, and it is said that they changed their family name to 'Hayashi' in the generation of Inaba Michimura.  The Inaba are descending from Kōno Michitaka (died 1374), who descend from Emperor Kanmu (736–805).

One famous figure, Hayashi Hidesada, was a senior retainer of Oda Nobunaga. The family originated in the village of Oki Village in the Kasugai District of Owari Province. In the Edo period, the family became retainers of the Owari Domain.

Notable figures
 Hayashi Hidesada
 Hayashi Michitomo (林通具)
 Hayashi Michimasa (林通政)

References
 Buke-kaden page on the Hayashi clan of Owari. (18 Sept. 2007)
Frederic, Louis (2002). "Japan Encyclopedia." Cambridge, Massachusetts: Harvard University Press.

Japanese clans
Inaba clan